Apostolepis thalesdelemai is a species of snake in the family Colubridae. It is endemic to Brazil.

References 

thalesdelemai
Reptiles described in 2017
Reptiles of Brazil